Andreas Bjelland (born 11 July 1988) is a Danish-Norwegian professional footballer who plays as a centre-back for Lyngby. He represented Denmark at international level and was part of the Danes' Euro 2012 squad. He is also adept as a full back or defensive midfielder.

Club career

Lyngby 
A centre back, Bjelland began his career in his homeland with Fredensborg BI and BSV, before moving into the youth system at Superliga club Lyngby in 2001. Financial problems at the stricken club saw the Royal Blues relegated to the Danmarksserien, but by the time Bjelland made his senior debut in September 2006, they had risen back to the 1st Division. He made 9 appearances during the 2006–07 and after promotion to the Superliga, he made 11 appearances in 2007–08. After an immediate relegation back to the 1st Division, Bjelland finally broke into the team and during the 2008–09 season made 24 appearances and scored one goal. After five early-2009–10 season appearances, Bjelland departed Lyngby on 31 August 2009. He made 47 appearances and scored one goal for the club.

FC Nordsjælland
Bjelland returned to the Superliga to sign for FC Nordsjælland on 31 August 2009. He quickly established himself in the team and made 26 appearances, scoring one goal. His season was capped by success in the DBU Pokalen, with Nordsjælland beating Midtjylland 2–0 in the final after extra time. Bjelland had another successful season in 2010–11, being named vice-captain and again winning the DBU Pokalen at the expense of Midtjylland. He made 29 appearances and scored one goal in a 2011–12 season which saw Nordsjælland win the Superliga title for the first time in the club's history. Bjelland departed the club in June 2012, after making 85 appearances and scoring three goals during three seasons at Farum Park.

FC Twente 
On 6 November 2011, it was announced that Bjelland had signed a four-year contract (with the option of a further year) with Dutch Eredivisie club FC Twente, effective from the beginning of the 2012–13 season. He had a debut season to forget at De Grolsch Veste, spending six months out with a broken metatarsal and making only 14 appearances. He came back fit for the 2013–14 season and was a virtual ever-present as Twente managed a third-place finish in the Eredivisie. Bjelland was named as captain for the 2014–15 season, but he was in and out of the team, due to injuries and suspensions. He left the club on 2 July 2015, after making 79 appearances and scoring three goals during his three seasons in Enschede.

Brentford

On 2 July 2015, Bjelland moved to England to sign for Championship club Brentford on a three-year contract for a club-record €3 million fee. After recovering from a groin injury suffered in pre-season, Bjelland made his debut for the club with a start in a League Cup first round match versus Oxford United on 11 August. He was at fault for Oxford's first goal of the 4–0 defeat and suffered a knee ligament injury on the stroke of half time.

Bjelland returned to full-contact training in late April 2016 and despite missing part of the 2016–17 pre-season with an abductor strain, he entered the regular season fit. He broke into the starting lineup in an unfamiliar left back role in mid-September 2016. After the team's formation was switched to 3–5–2 three months later, he reverted to his usual centre back position. Bjelland missed much of March and April 2017 through injury and finished the season with 29 appearances.

Bjelland deputised for the absent Harlee Dean early in the 2017–18 season scored his first Brentford goal in a 4–3 defeat to Nottingham Forest 12 August 2017. After Dean's departure at the end of the summer transfer window, Bjelland continued as an automatic pick for the remainder of the 2017–18 season. Despite suffering from an achilles problem during the final two months of the season, Bjelland finished the campaign with 35 appearances and one goal. After failing to agree a new contract, he was released on 30 June 2018. During three seasons at Griffin Park, Bjelland made 65 appearances and scored one goal.

F.C. Copenhagen 
On 9 July 2018, Bjelland returned to Denmark to sign a four-year contract with Superliga club F.C. Copenhagen on a free transfer. The deal made him one of the highest-paid players in Danish Superliga history. He made 41 appearances and scored one goal during the club's 2018–19 Superliga-winning season. During a 2019–20 season which featured a run to the quarter-finals of the Europa League and a runners-up finish in the Superliga, Bjelland made 30 appearances. Bjelland made three appearances during the opening month of the 2020–21 season, before suffering a "bad cocktail" of problems with injury and COVID-19. He did not appear again before the end of the season. Bjelland spent the final year of his contract away on loan and was released when it expired.

Return to Lyngby 
On 15 July 2021, Bjelland returned to Danish 1st Division club Lyngby on a season-long loan. He made 25 appearances and scored one goal during a 2021–22 season which culminated in promotion to the Danish Superliga. Taking a pay cut from his previous contract with F.C. Copenhagen, Bjelland signed a one-year permanent contract with Lyngby in May 2022. On 28 August 2022, his sixth appearance of the 2022–23 season, Bjelland suffered a broken and dislocated ankle during a 2–1 defeat to Viborg. He underwent surgery five days later and returned fit for the resumption of the season after the winter break.

International career

Youth 
Despite being eligible to represent Norway, Bjelland represented Denmark at U16, U18, U19 and U21 level, captaining the latter team and making three appearances at the 2011 European U21 Championship, hosted in Denmark.

Full 
Bjelland made his full international debut in a 0–0 friendly draw with the Czech Republic on 17 November 2010 and played the full 90 minutes. He received his second call up 11 months later, when he was selected for a pair of Euro 2012 qualifiers against Cyprus and Portugal, in which he started and helped the team to wins. Bjelland scored his first international goal with penalty to seal a 2–0 friendly win over Australia on 2 June 2012. He was called into Denmark's squad for Euro 2012, but failed to make an appearance before the team crashed out in the group stage.

Following Euro 2012, a metatarsal injury suffered on club duty with Twente saw Bjelland miss a year of international football and he made his return in a 2–1 friendly win over Georgia on 5 June 2013. He scored his second international goal in a 6–0 2014 World Cup qualifying win over Malta on 15 October 2013. Bjelland made regular appearances through 2014, but a knee ligament injury meant that failed to appear for Denmark between June 2015 and 11 November 2016, when he made his comeback playing the full 90 minutes of a 4–0 2018 World Cup qualifying win over Kazakhstan. He was included in Denmark’s preliminary squad for the 2018 World Cup, but was not named in the final squad, due to injury.

Personal life 
Bjelland was born to a Norwegian father and a Danish mother. His younger brother Thomas was also a footballer for BSV and Hellerup. He has two daughters. In 2018, Bjelland invested a reported amount of DKK 200,000 (approximately £25,000) in his former club Lyngby and consequently became a minority owner of the club.

Career statistics

Honours 
FC Nordsjælland
 Danish Superliga (1): 2011–12
 DBU Pokalen (2): 2009–10, 2010–11

FC Copenhagen

 Danish Superliga (1): 2018–19
Lyngby

 Danish 1st Division second-place promotion: 2021–22

References

External links

 Andreas Bjelland at vi.nl 

 
 

1988 births
Living people
Danish men's footballers
Danish expatriate men's footballers
Denmark youth international footballers
Denmark under-21 international footballers
BK Søllerød-Vedbæk players
Fredensborg BI players
Lyngby Boldklub players
FC Nordsjælland players
FC Twente players
Brentford F.C. players
F.C. Copenhagen players
Danish Superliga players
Danish 1st Division players
Eredivisie players
English Football League players
Expatriate footballers in the Netherlands
UEFA Euro 2012 players
Association football defenders
Denmark international footballers
Danish expatriate sportspeople in England
Expatriate footballers in England
Danish people of Norwegian descent
People from Fredensborg Municipality
Sportspeople from the Capital Region of Denmark